Frumosu is a commune located in Suceava County, Romania. It is composed of three villages: Deia, Dragoșa, and Frumosu.

Natives
 Toma Niga

References

Communes in Suceava County
Localities in Southern Bukovina